Acrocomia media is a species of palm which is native to Puerto Rico and the Virgin Islands.

Description
Acrocomia media is a pinnately leaved palm with a solitary, stout stem.

Taxonomy
American botanist George Proctor considered A. media to be a valid species on the basis of its shorter, more slender trunk, but other authors considered it a synonym of A. aculeata.

Common names
Acrocomia media is commonly known as coroso or palma de coroso in Puerto Rico.

References

media
Trees of Puerto Rico
Trees of the Virgin Islands
Plants described in 1901